Upper Esk is a rural locality in the local government areas (LGA) of Break O'Day and Dorset in the North-east LGA region of Tasmania. The 2016 census recorded a population of 26 for the state suburb of Upper Esk.

History 
Upper Esk was gazetted as a locality in 1976. 

The name was changed from Cloverdale in 1948.

Geography
The South Esk River rises in the north of the locality and flows through to the east.

Road infrastructure 
Route C401 (Upper Esk Road / Gunns Road) passes through from east to west before forming part of the western boundary. Route C423 (Mathinna Plains Road) runs along part of the eastern boundary.

References

Towns in Tasmania
Localities of Break O'Day Council
Localities of Dorset Council (Australia)